Nova União is a municipality located in the Brazilian state of Minas Gerais. The city belongs to the mesoregion Metropolitana de Belo Horizonte and to the microregion of Itabira.  , the estimated population was 5,732.

See also
 List of municipalities in Minas Gerais

References

Municipalities in Minas Gerais